Tristan Mouric is a French Paralympic athlete who competed both at the Summer and Winter Paralympics. In total, he won seven gold medals, three silver medals and one bronze medal.

He first competed at the 1984 Winter Paralympics in alpine skiing. He also represented France in alpine skiing at the Winter Paralympics in 1988, 1992, 1994 and 1998.

He also represented France at the 1988 Summer Paralympics and at the 1992 Summer Paralympics in cycling. In 1988 he won the gold medal in the Men's Road 50 km LC2 event.

Achievements

Cycling

Alpine skiing

See also 
 List of Paralympic medalists in alpine skiing

References 

Living people
Year of birth missing (living people)
Place of birth missing (living people)
Paralympic alpine skiers of France
Alpine skiers at the 1984 Winter Paralympics
Alpine skiers at the 1988 Winter Paralympics
Alpine skiers at the 1992 Winter Paralympics
Alpine skiers at the 1994 Winter Paralympics
Alpine skiers at the 1998 Winter Paralympics
Medalists at the 1984 Winter Paralympics
Medalists at the 1988 Winter Paralympics
Medalists at the 1992 Winter Paralympics
Medalists at the 1994 Winter Paralympics
Medalists at the 1988 Summer Paralympics
Paralympic gold medalists for France
Paralympic silver medalists for France
Paralympic bronze medalists for France
Paralympic medalists in alpine skiing
Paralympic medalists in cycling
Paralympic cyclists of France
20th-century French people